Arya Mahila Mahavidyalaya (Hindi: आर्य महिला महाविद्यालय) also known as Arya Mahila Degree College and as Arya Mahila PG College is a women's college in Varanasi, Uttar Pradesh, India admitted to the privileges of Banaras Hindu University. It was established in 1956 by Shri Arya Mahila Hitakarini Mahaparishad.

History

Arya Mahila Mahavidyalaya was established in 1956 by Shri Arya Mahila Hitakarini Mahaparishad. The college is affiliated to Banaras Hindu University.

Courses
The college offers;

Undergraduate courses in Arts, Social Sciences and Commerce (B.A).
Undergraduate courses in Education (B.Ed).
Post graduate courses in Sociology, Economics and Linguistics (M.A).

See also
Banaras Hindu University
DAV Post Graduate College Varanasi
List of educational institutions in Varanasi

References

1956 establishments in Uttar Pradesh
Educational institutions established in 1956
Universities and colleges in Varanasi
Women's universities and colleges in Uttar Pradesh
Colleges in India